Diego Valentín Díaz (died 1660) was a Spanish historical painter and a familiar of the Holy Office. He was a native of Valladolid. Díaz painted many important pictures for churches and monasteries, especially for the church of San Benito, now a barrack, and the convents of St. Jerome and of St. Francis, of which the Jubilee of the Porciuncula in the latter house was one of the most esteemed. His Holy Family, painted for San Benito, is now in the Museum at Valladolid; but his best work was the altar-piece representing the Annunciation of the Virgin painted for the Hospital for Orphan Girls which he founded at Valladolid. The architecture and perspective are in the finest style, and the statues introduced are admirably executed. Díaz died at Valladolid in 1660. He accumulated considerable wealth, the greater part of which he left for the support of this hospital, at which site he was buried, and where are preserved the portraits of the munificent artist and of his wife – "he a grey-haired sharp old man, she a dark-eyed dame."

References
 

Year of birth unknown
1660 deaths
17th-century Spanish painters
Spanish male painters
People from Valladolid